The Nite Life is an Australian Christian pop radio program on the Life FM network. Like Neighbours, many of the notable Christian personalities in Australia originate from that show. The show is of talk back format, and consists of different radio jocks every night of the week. The show simulcasts the Hot 25 Countdown on Friday as most listeners are at youth group.

Hosts
The show was formally hosted by the radio jock Kate Collins, who has since moved to Channel Nine.  The biggest competitors are the Hot 30 Countdown and the Nova 9's.

Monday - Brad, Ben, Jayne, Amie, Haydn
Tuesday - KJ - Pomfus	
Wednesday - Joel - Josh - Seth - Sedrick Sockington
Thursday - Chloe - Bek - Carol - Bec (Mercy Ministries)

See also
Hot 30 Countdown
Nova 9's

Christian rock radio programs
Australian radio programs